A list of films produced in Pakistan in the year 1965:

1965

See also
 1965 in Pakistan

References

External links
 Search Pakistani film - IMDB.com

1965
Pakistani
Films